Parkland Magnet High School is a magnet school in Winston-Salem, North Carolina that offers an International Baccalaureate program and describes itself as a "Center for the Cultural Arts". Parkland was founded in 1965 as Parkland High School.

The school's campus is located on the south side of Winston-Salem, and is easily accessible from Interstate 40, US Highway 52, and Peters Creek Parkway.

The campus includes a main building, several multi-classroom pod trailers, a practice football field, competition track, baseball and softball fields. The main building houses the school's administrative offices, cafeteria, two gymnasiums, and auditorium as well as 80 classrooms. The football & lacrosse teams plays their home games at Deaton-Thompson stadium located off West Clemmonsville Road which is located approximately 1.4 miles from the school's campus. The soccer teams play their home games at the W-S/FC Soccer Complex on Bolton street, which is approximately 3.2 miles from Parkland's campus.

Academics
Parkland Magnet High School is an accredited International Baccalaureate World School. The IB Diploma Program itself takes place during the 11th and 12th grades, however the foundation necessary for success in the program is laid in 9th and 10th grade courses. The rigorous course of study provides a liberal arts curriculum from a global perspective, university-level work, and required examinations that are developed and marked on an international standard.

In addition to the International Baccalaureate program, Parkland also offers a conventional course load for its students.

Athletics 

Parkland Magnet High School competes in a total of 23 men's and women's sports in the Central Piedmont Conference, which is affiliated with the North Carolina High School Athletic Association (NCHSAA). The school's mascot is the Mustang. In Parkland's athletic history, they have been classified as a 3A and 4A school, currently they are in the 4A classification as of 2021–2022.

Achievements 
The following are team state championships the school has earned in its history:
4A Women's Indoor Track & Field2014, 2015
4A Women's Outdoor Track & Field2014, 2015
4A Wrestling State Dual Team2010, 2011, 2012, 2013, 2014
4A Wrestling State Tournament2010, 2011, 2013, 2014
3A Men's Basketball1999
3A Football2001
3A Women's Outdoor Track & Field2019
3A Wrestling State Dual Team1995, 1996, 2007, 2008, 2009
3A Wrestling State Tournament1997, 2007, 2008, 2009
1A/2A/3A Men's Indoor Track & Field2007

State Track & Field Relay State Championships:Women's Outdoor Track and Field Event Champions. Retrieved November 25, 2021.

2021 3A Girls Outdoor 4x200 Meter Relay
2021 3A Girls Outdoor 4x100 Meter Relay
2019 3A Girls Indoor 4x200 Meter Relay
2019 3A Girls Outdoor 4x200 Meter Relay
2019 3A Girls Outdoor 4x100 Meter Relay
2018 3A Girls Indoor 4x200 Meter Relay
2018 3A Girls Outdoor 4x200 Meter Relay
2018 3A Girls Outdoor 4x100 Meter Relay
2017 4A Boys Indoor 4x200 Meter Relay
2017 4A Boys Outdoor 4x200 Meter Relay
2017 4A Boys Outdoor 4x100 Meter Relay
2016 4A Girls Outdoor 4x200 Meter Relay
2015 4A Girls Indoor 4x400 Meter Relay
2015 4A Girls Indoor 4x200 Meter Relay
2015 4A Girls Outdoor 4x400 Meter Relay
2015 4A Girls Outdoor 4x200 Meter Relay
2014 4A Girls Outdoor 4x400 Meter Relay
2014 4A Girls Outdoor 4x200 Meter Relay
2014 4A Girls Outdoor 4x100 Meter Relay 
2013 4A Girls Outdoor 4x200 Meter Relay 
2013 4A Girls Outdoor 4x100 Meter Relay 
2009 3A Girls Outdoor 4x100 Meter Relay 
2007 1A/2A/3A Boys Indoor 4x400 Meter Relay 
2007 1A/2A/3A Girls Indoor 4x400 Meter Relay 
2006 3A Girls Outdoor 4x400 Meter Relay 
2006 3A Girls Outdoor 4x200 Meter Relay
2006 3A Girls Outdoor 4x100 Meter RelayWrestling Team'''

In addition to holding outright or sharing many North Carolina High School State Records, the Parkland wrestling team holds the following National Records:
 Most Team Points in a Season (Duals and Tournaments): 5432.5 Points, 2007–08
 Average Dual Meet Margin of Victory: 67.38, 2007–08
 Pins in a Season: 542, 2007–08

The Parkland wrestling team also had an unbeaten streak from 2007–2014, winning 345 dual meets in a row. During this time they won 8 straight dual team state championships, with 7 state tournament championships. Parkland's win streak was the second longest stretch of consecutive dual meet victories in the country, behind Brandon High School (Florida).

Notable alumni
Cy Alexander  college basketball head coach
Chris Barber  professional football player
Tony Covington  professional football player
Doug Middleton  professional football player
Eric Daniel Peddle  screenwriter, film director and author
Vickie Sawyer  member of the North Carolina State Senate

References

External links 
 Parkland Magnet High School website
 Parkland High School Official Wrestling Website

International Baccalaureate schools in North Carolina
High schools in Winston-Salem, North Carolina
Public high schools in North Carolina
Magnet schools in North Carolina
Educational institutions established in 1965
1965 establishments in North Carolina